DVC can refer to:
 Damodar Valley Corporation, India
 Deer–vehicle collisions
 Deputy Vice-Chancellor of a university
 Diablo Valley College, California, US
 Digital Video Cassette, later MiniDV
 Diligentia, Vis, Celeritas, Latin for "Precicion, Power, Speed", the motto of the International Practical Shooting Confederation
 Disney Vacation Club, a vacation timeshare company
 Divers centre (abbreviated as DVC), Miscellaneous centre, designation for a centrist candidate without political party in France.
 Data Version Control

See also
 DVC 1, a submarine